Mark Evander Telea (born 6 December 1996) is a New Zealand rugby union player who plays for the  in Super Rugby and  in the Bunnings NPC. His playing position is wing.

Career
After showing promising form for  during the 2019 Mitre 10 Cup season, Telea was named in the  squad for the 2020 Super Rugby season. Telea started the campaign as the first choice left wing for the Blues. Telea rewarded the faith of Blues staff, impressing with his early season form. Telea scored 3 tries during a Round 2 fixture, as the Blues defeated the Waratahs 32-12 in rainy conditions in Newcastle. Telea crossed again in Round 4 vs the Bulls in Pretoria, scoring impressively to dot the ball down as two defenders forced him into touch. He continued his good form in Super Rugby Aotearoa and in mid 2020 he was chosen for the North Island in the North vs South rugby union match. Telea was named in the  squad for the 2020 Mitre 10 Cup making his debut for the Mako in Round 1 against . Telea played 11 games for the Mako in the 2020 season as they went on to win their second premiership title in a row. Telea had a mixed 2021 Super Rugby Aotearoa season but returned to form during the Super Rugby Trans-Tasman competition, scoring a try in the final as the Blues defeated the  23-15. In Round 3 of the 2021 Bunnings NPC Telea suffered a season ending injury while playing for Tasman against .

On June 30, 2022, after an impressive 2022 Super Rugby season with the Blues, Telea was called in to the All Blacks squad as a replacement. 

On November 12, 2022, he got named at 14 in the starting line-up to go up against Scotland. During his debut match he scored two tries.

Personal life
Telea has South African ancestry from his father and Samoan ancestry from his mother.

Reference list

External links
Mark Telea at Allblacks.com
itsrugby.co.uk profile

1996 births
New Zealand rugby union players
Living people
Rugby union wings
North Harbour rugby union players
Blues (Super Rugby) players
Tasman rugby union players
New Zealand sportspeople of Samoan descent
New Zealand people of South African descent
New Zealand international rugby union players